Zahervand-e Sofla (also Romanized as Z̧āhervand-e Soflá; also known as Z̧āhervand, Zāre‘vand-e Pā’īn, and Zāre‘vand-e Soflá) is a village in Helilan Rural District, Helilan District, Chardavol County, Ilam Province, Iran. At the 2006 census, its population was 241, in 49 families. The village is populated by Kurds.

References 

Populated places in Chardavol County
Kurdish settlements in Ilam Province